Wahnes's parotia (Parotia wahnesi) is a medium-sized passerine of the bird-of-paradise family (Paradisaeidae). This species is distributed and endemic to the mountain forests of Huon Peninsula and Adelbert Mountains, northeast Papua New Guinea. The diet consists mainly of fruits and arthropods.

The name honors the German naturalist Carl Wahnes, who collected in New Guinea.

Wahnes's parotia is evaluated as Vulnerable on the IUCN Red List of Threatened Species. It is listed on Appendix II of CITES; its threat classification is C2a(1). This indicates that less than 10,000 adult birds exist, fragmented into subpopulations of less than 1000, and that they are probably declining.

Description
The male has an iridescent yellow-green breast shield, elongated black plumes, three erectile spatule head wires behind each eye, coppery-bronzed nasal tuft feathers and long, wedge-shaped tail feathers. The female is a rich brown bird with blackish head. It is approximately 43 cm long.

Breeding
Little is known about its life and habits. The male is polygamous and performs a spectacular courtship dance in the forest ground.

The clutch probably contains 1, maybe 2 eggs. These are about 40 x 26 mm and have a pale cream base color. They have a varying pattern of streaks and dots, dense at the large end and very sparse on the other, and consisting of a lower gray and an upper tan layer with some overlap.(Mackay 1990)

References

 Mackay, Margaret D. (1990): The Egg of Wahnes' Parotia Parotia wahnesi (Paradisaeidae). Emu 90(4): 269. PDF fulltext

External links

 BirdLife Species Factsheet
 Audio and Video from the Macaulay Library

Parotia
Birds of Papua New Guinea
Birds described in 1906